The Department of Civil and Environmental Engineering (CEE) at the University of Illinois Urbana–Champaign, one of 12 departments within the University of Illinois College of Engineering, has been in existence for more than 140 years, since the year the University was founded.

Both the undergraduate and graduate programs of Civil and Environmental Engineering at Illinois are consistently ranked as the best (#1-3) of such programs in the United States by the US News & World Report.

References

External links
 Department of Civil and Environmental Engineering, University of Illinois Urbana-Champaign

University of Illinois Urbana-Champaign
Educational institutions established in 1867
University departments in the United States
1867 establishments in Illinois